The Ehrich & Graetz metalworks was a factory established in 1866 in Berlin by Albert Graetz  (1831–1901) and the tradesman Emil Ehrich (died 1887) under the name "Lampen-Fabrik Ehrich & Graetz OHG" (E&G). The logo of the firm was two seahorse-looking dragons with a sun between them, and the firm's initials of E&G.

Ehrich & Graetz factory 
In the beginning kerosene lamps along with burners, as well as cookers for fluid (Wood alcohol, Paraffin), gaseous fuels (Town gas, Propane, and Natural Gas) were made in the "Lampen-Fabrik Ehrich & Graetz OHG" (E&G) factory.  By 1897 the firm was controlled by Albert's sons, Max Graetz, and Adolf Graetz.  The company grew rapidly, and in 1899 a factory complex was built in the Elsenstrasse in Berlin. At that time the company had establishments in the United States, France, the UK, and Bombay (now Mumbai).  Around 1910-1916 Max Graetz developed the famous Petromax Lantern.  Around 1925 the factory also produced radios, and other electrical appliances under the name Graetzor.  In 1928 Fritz Graetz (Son of Max) took over the management of the firm.

World War II 
In the Second World War, just as in the First World War, the company was part of the war industry.  With the use of forced laborers from France, Russia, and the Netherlands the company made huge gains in production.  Around 1942 the first letter "E" in the company logo was dropped leaving only the second letter "G."  On the 27th of  February 1943 the Jewish forced laborers were taken away by the SS.  At the end of April 1945 the factory was claimed by the Russian army.  At the end of 1945 the factory was running again, but only producing pots, pans, and other small metal work.

Volkseigener Betrieb
In 1949 the firm became nationalized as a "VEB-Volkseigener Betrieb" and named from 1950 on VEB Fernmeldewerk, Berlin Treptow (RFFT). Volkseigener Betrieb means that the factory was owned by the people for the people (Communism)

Graetz AG
In 1948 Erich, and Fritz Graetz founded a new company in Altena, Germany known by the name Graetz AG, which was successor to the lost family company in Berlin.  The new company produced mainly radios, and televisions. However the Petromax, the paraffin pressure lamp invented and designed by Max Graetz, was produced here in great numbers, which gave the unit one last revival.  In 1961 the company was then sold to Standard Elektrik Lorenz (SEL) AG, but since 1987 has been to the present owned by the Finnish company Nokia.

See also
Kerosene lamp

External links
www.petromax.nl
Short History of Petromax and Graetz

Manufacturing companies based in Berlin

de:Petromax
nl:Ehrich&Graetz
nl:Petromax